Belmonte is a 2018 Uruguayan drama film directed by Federico Veiroj. It was screened in the Contemporary World Cinema section at the 2018 Toronto International Film Festival.

Cast
 Gonzalo Delgado as Javier Belmonte
 Olivia Molinaro Eijo as Celeste Belmonte
 Jeannette Sauksteliskis as Jeanne

References

External links
 

2018 films
2018 drama films
Uruguayan drama films
2010s Spanish-language films